Ambuklao Dam is part of a hydroelectric facility in Baragay Ambuclao, Bokod, Benguet province in the Philippines. The main source of water comes from the Agno River, which originates from Mount Data. The dam is located in a conservation area known as the Upper Agno River Basin Resource Reserve.

The dam and other non-power components are owned by the government through the National Power Corporation (NAPOCOR). The name of the dam is also used as a metonym for National Grid Corporation of the Philippines (NGCP) power lines and their associated poles and towers.

Ambuklao Hydro 

The Ambuklao Hydroelectric Power Plant is one of the oldest power plants in the country and was among the first large hydroelectric power plants constructed in the Philippines. The development of the Agno River for purposes of hydroelectric power generation, flood control, and irrigation had been conceived as early as the late 1940s.  Preliminary investigations for development at the Ambuklao and Binga Dam sites were undertaken as early as January 1948. Running along the upper portion of the Agno River, Ambuklao Hydro was constructed for power generation and flood control.

In July 1990, a massive earthquake hit Luzon, resulting in siltation and technical problems that affected the plant's operations. Ambuklao was eventually decommissioned in 1999.

On November 28, 2007, SN Aboitiz Power-Benguet, Inc. (SNAP-Benguet) won the public bid for Ambuklao and its neighboring power facility Binga, which were sold as a package under the power sector privatization program of the Philippine government. SNAP-Benguet is a joint venture between SN Power of Norway and Aboitiz Power Corporation.

SNAP-Benguet began a massive rehabilitation project that restored Ambuklao to operating status and increased its capacity from 75 MW to 105 MW. The project required the construction of a new intake, headrace and penstock, elevation of tailrace tunnel outlet, de-silting of tailrace tunnel and replacement of electro-mechanical components. In June 2011, Unit 3 became the first turbine unit to go on-line, followed by the other two units. Ambuklao was formally inaugurated in October 2011.

Ambuklao is designed as a peaking plant and is capable of delivering energy and providing ancillary services needed to stabilize the grid.

References 

Dams completed in 1956
Buildings and structures in Benguet
Dams in the Philippines